"I'm Over You" is a song by Martine McCutcheon. Written by the songwriting duo Carl Sturken and Evan Rogers, the single became McCutcheon's second-highest-charting single (behind the 1999 number-one "Perfect Moment"), peaking at number two on the UK Singles Chart in November 2000, behind the Spice Girls' "Holler"/"Let Love Lead the Way". The song also found modest success in Ireland, reaching number 23.

Track listings

UK CD single
 "I'm Over You" (radio edit) – 3:42
 "I'm Over You" (Xenomania Club Mix) – 7:25
 "Perfect Moment" (Sleaze Sisters Anthem Mix) – 7:30

UK cassette single
A1. "I'm Over You" (radio edit) – 3:42
A2. "I'm Over You" (G-A-Y Mix) – 6:24
B1. "Rainy Days (Sleaze Sisters Anthem Mix) – 8:00

Charts

Weekly charts

Year-end charts

References

2000 songs
2000 singles
Innocent Records singles
Martine McCutcheon songs
Songs written by Carl Sturken and Evan Rogers
Virgin Records singles